The women's 200 metre butterfly competition at the 2018 Mediterranean Games was held on 25 June 2018 at the Campclar Aquatic Center.

Records 
Prior to this competition, the existing world and Mediterranean Games records were as follows:

Results

Heats 
The heats were held at 09:50.

Final 
The final  was held at 17:57.

References 

Women's 200 metre butterfly
2018 in women's swimming